Shammi Kapoor was an Indian actor who starred in over 50 films as lead actor, and over 20 films in supporting roles. He has won the Filmfare Award for Best Actor once, for his performance in the film Brahmachari (1968).

Films

Television

References

Indian filmographies
Male actor filmographies